Todo may refer to:
 Todo Bichig, Kalmyk ‘Clear Script’
 To-do list, a time management implementation
 TODO (tag), a computer programming comment tag
 Todo (album)

Tōdō may refer to:
 Tōkyūjutsu or Tōdō, a Japanese divination (fortune telling) method
 Tōdōza or Tōdō, a Japanese guild for blind male musicians
 Tōdō Heisuke (1844–1867), samurai
 Tōdō Takatora (1556–1630), daimyō
 Tōdō Takayuki (1813–1895), daimyō
 Izumi Todo, pseudonym for the staff at Toei Animation

See also
 To do
 Toto (disambiguation)